Renier or Rénier may refer to:

Given name:
Renier Botha (born 1992), South African rugby union player
Renier Coetzee PS, General Officer in the South African Army
François Renier Duminy (1747–1811), French mariner, navigator, cartographer and South African pioneer
Renier Erasmus, South African rugby union player
Renier de Huy, 12th-century metalworker and sculptor
Renier of St Laurent (died 1188), twelfth-century Benedictine monk of St Laurent Abbey, Liège
Giustina Renier Michiel (1755–1832), aristocratic woman who helped intellectual and social Venetian life flourish
Renier I of Montferrat (1084–1135), ruler of the state of Montferrat in north-west Italy from about 1100 to his death
Renier of Montferrat (1162–1183), the fifth son of William V of Montferrat and Judith of Babenberg
Renier Schoeman (born 1983), South African rugby union player
Jan Renier Snieders (1812–1888), Flemish writer, brother of August Snieders
Renier of Trit, the first Frankish duke of Philippopolis (modern Plovdiv, Bulgaria) from 1204 to 1205
Renier van Tzum (1600–1670), merchant/trader and official of the Dutch East India Company
Renier Vázquez (born 1979), Spanish chess player, Grand Master in 2007
Renier Zen (died 1268), the 45th Doge of Venice, reigning from January 1, 1253, until his death in 1268

Surname:
Alphonse Renier, Belgian football player who competed in the 1900 Olympic Games
Ferdinand Renier, Belgian weightlifter
Franck Rénier (born 1974), French professional road bicycle racer
G. J. Renier (1892–1962), professor of Dutch History at University College London
Jérémie Renier (born 1981), Belgian actor
Joseph Emile Renier (1887–1966) American sculptor, professor and medalist
Marc Renier (born 1953), former Belgian racing cyclist
Paolo Renier (1710–1789), Venetian statesman, the 119th, and penultimate, Doge of Venice
Pascal Renier (born 1971), Belgian football defender
Yannick Renier (born 1975), Belgian actor in theatre, film and television

Geography:
Renier Point (6094–6094), the east extremity of both Burgas Peninsula and Livingston Island in the South Shetland Islands, Antarctica

See also
Regnier (disambiguation)
Reinier
Renierite
Reynier (disambiguation)

fr:Rénier
it:Renier